is a Japanese professional football club based in Kagoshima, Kagoshima Prefecture, Japan that was formed from the merger of Volca Kagoshima and FC Kagoshima. Both clubs played in the Kyushu Soccer League before the merger. Their top team currently plays in the J3 League, Japan's 3rd tier of professional league football. Their secondary team plays in the Kagoshima Prefectural League as Kagoshima United FC SECOND.

History

Origins (1959–2013) 
Volca Kagoshima was established in 1959 as Kagoshima Teachers' Soccer Club. The club was a founding member of the Kyushu Soccer League in 1973. Since the league's inception, the club had always played in this league and never be relegated to the Prefectural Leagues until the merge with FC Kagoshima in 2014. They advanced to the Regional League promotion series five times, but never succeeded to promote to the upper tier, Japan Football League, known as the highest level for amateur club football in the country. The club changed the name from Kagoshima Teachers to Volca Kagoshima in 1995. 

FC Kagoshima was established in 1994 as an affiliated club of the National Institute of Fitness and Sports in Kanoya. They were promoted to the Kyushu Soccer League as early as 2004 and changed the name to Osumi NIFS United FC. 

Both of Volca and NIFS have been seeking the way to promote to the JFL separately. The idea of a merged club of Volca and FC Kagoshima (renamed from NIFS in 2010) had been discussed by the Kagoshima Prefectural Football Association as early as 2012, however, it was failed to reach an agreement at that time. Although Volca and FC Kagoshima had applied for J.League Associate Membership separately, both sides restarted their talk about the merger, then finally agreed with merging their clubs to aim promotion to the J.League, in response of the advisory by the J.League organization. As both clubs had advanced to the final round of the Regional League promotion series in 2013, the merged club earned the promotion to the JFL of 2014.

Kagoshima United (2014–) 
The two clubs, Volca Kagoshima and FC Kagoshima, were merged in 2014 to form Kagoshima United. In November 2015, after finishing promotion zone in 2015, they received J.League license to participate in the J3 League.

In 2018, Kagoshima United was promoted to the J2 League after five years at the J3.

In 2019, Kagoshima United was instantly relegated back to the J3, after a 21st-place finish in their J3 debut season. The club will play their 4th consecutive season at the J3 League on 2023.

Rivalries 
The traditional rival of Kagoshima United is Roasso Kumamoto, the prefectural neighbours and former Kyushu Soccer League fellows since 1983 until 2005, except 2001–2002. Matches between the two clubs are labelled Hisatsu derby (肥薩ダービー, "Kumamoto-Kagoshima derby") and generate a lot of interest in both prefectures.

League & cup record 

Key

Honours

Volca Kagoshima (1959–2013) 
Kyushu Soccer League (1973–)
Champions (3): 1974, 1986, 2013

FC Kagoshima (1994–2013) 
Kyushu Soccer League (1973–)
Champions (1): 2012

Kagoshima United (2014–) 
J3 League (2014–)
Runners-up (1): 2018

League history 
Regional (Kyushu): 1973–2013
Division 4 (JFL): 2014–2015
Division 3 (J3): 2016–2018
Division 2 (J2): 2019
Division 3 (J3): 2020–

Current squad 
As of 11 January 2023.

Out on loan

Coaching staff
For the 2023 season.

Managerial history

Crest and colours 
The club crest has the illustrations of Sakurajima and Kagoshima Bay, both symbolize Kagoshima Prefecture, on its background design, with red colour, which represents Volca, and light blue colour, represents FC Kagoshima.

Kit evolution 
Kagoshima United's club colours are white and navy.

References

External links
Official website (in Japanese)

 
Football clubs in Japan
Japan Football League clubs
J.League clubs
Sports teams in Kagoshima Prefecture
Association football clubs established in 2014
2014 establishments in Japan